The following is a list of first-round draft picks selected by the Toronto Argonauts of the Canadian Football League. The Argonauts participated in the first Canadian College Draft in 1953 when only eastern teams were permitted to make selections. From 1960-1962, only eastern teams and the Calgary Stampeders participated in the draft as the other western clubs signed players from universities in their area. This list also includes all territorial exemptions from 1973, when teams were first permitted to selected players within their designated area, until 1985 when these exemptions were abolished.

The Toronto Argonauts have had the first overall selection in the draft 14 times since its inception in 1953, the most of any team. Since 1953, the Argonauts have lost their first round pick 17 times due to trades. Not including territorial exemptions, the most first-round picks the Argoanuts have had in one year is four, which occurred in the 1982 CFL Draft.

Player selections

References

Draft 1
Toronto Argonauts